This is a list of finalists for the 2004 Archibald Prize for portraiture (listed is Artist – Title).

Richard Bell – I am not sorry – (self-portrait)
Jason Benjamin – Bread & circuses – (John Olsen) (Image)
Danelle Bergstrom – Franco Belgiorno-Nettis – 'larger than life 
David Bromley – McLean & friends 
Ann Cape – Figure within the landscape: Guy Warren OAM 
Tom Carment – Euan Macleod 
Kevin Connor – Paul Connor – architect 
Michael Conole – Ricky Swallow 2004 
Adam Cullen – Margaret Throsby 
Brian Dunlop – Brian Kenna: imagines Urfa
Gillian Dunlop – Lucy Culliton
Geoffrey Dyer – Graeme Murphy
McLean Edwards – Martin Browne art dealer 
Joe Furlonger – Peter Hallinan, Tribal arts dealer (retired) & mountain bike racer 
Robert Hannaford – Self portrait 
Nicholas Harding – Studio visit: Rusty drops by with Blade & Tony 2002–04 
Paul Jackson – Self portrait with the last Huia 
Peter Kendall – Peter Brock 
Kerrie Lester – Garry Shead, Freckles and Max 
Mathew Lynn – Pat O'Shane
Gabrielle Martin – Tony Clark with Jasperware (landscape) 
Carolyn McKay Creecy – Bruce Spence
Lewis Miller – Self portrait III 
Henry Mulholland – Nick Meyers 
Paul Newton – Self portrait 
David Paulson – Richard Bell, ‘I am not sorry’ 
Evert Ploeg – Jana Wendt (Winner of the Packing Room Prize)Rodney Pople – Self portrait after Henry Raeburn 
Paul Procèe – Tim Hall (from the faces series) 
Ben Quilty – Whytie 
Craig Ruddy – David Gulpilil, two worlds (Winner of the Archibald Prize and the People's Choice Award)'''
Paul Ryan – Self portrait, Bulli Beach 
Jenny Sages – Seeing the lights – Anthony Hopkins artist 
Jiawei Shen – Tom Hughes 
Pamela Tippett – Self portrait 
Henny Van den Wildenberg – The storyteller – Mem Fox 
Peter Wegner – Portrait of Jacques Reymond 
Paul Worstead – Me 
Michael Zavros – Portrait of Stephen Mori, with Win Schubert and my Greater Kudu 
Dalu Zhao – Life of stage – John Clarke''

See also
Previous year: List of Archibald Prize 2003 finalists
Next year: List of Archibald Prize 2005 finalists
List of Archibald Prize winners

References

External links
Archibald Prize 2004 finalists official website

2004
Arch
Archibald Prize 2004
Archibald Prize 2004
2004 in art
Arch
Archibald
Archibald